Eucalyptus pleurocorys is a species of mallee, sometimes a tree, that is endemic to Western Australia. It has rough, flaky or fibrous bark on the lower part of the trunk, smooth bark above, lance-shaped or curved adult leaves, flower buds in groups of between seven and eleven and conical fruit.

Description
It has rough, fibrous or flaky bark on the lower  of the trunk, smooth greyish bark above.

Taxonomy

Distribution and habitat
This mallee grows in a range of habitats from mallee scrub to woodland and heath. It grows in poorly-explored country between Caiguna and the Cape Arid National Park.

See also
List of Eucalyptus species

References

Eucalypts of Western Australia
pleurocorys
Myrtales of Australia
Plants described in 2001
Mallees (habit)